The English cricket team toured India during January, February and March 1993.  The tour was beset by controversy over England's poor performances and results, with selection, tour management, the Indian cuisine and climate, airport industrial action and even players' facial hair being blamed for the lack of success.

As far as squad selection was concerned, the primary focus was the omission of David Gower, who had averaged over 50 in the previous summer's series against Pakistan.  His replacement was Dermot Reeve who ended up not even featuring in the Test series.  The official reason for leaving Gower out of the squad was that he was "too old", but with veterans Mike Gatting and John Emburey also making the trip, despite having only just returned from a ban for playing cricket in apartheid South Africa, this seemed rather spurious.  Questions about it were even raised in Parliament and a special general meeting of the MCC convened, but to no effect, and Gower's presence in India was as a media representative only.  Buried beneath this furore was the additional omission of Jack Russell, considered by most to be England's best wicketkeeper, in favour of the largely unheralded Richard Blakey.

Indian captain Mohammad Azharuddin was also under considerable pressure heading into the series, after a poor tour of South Africa that led to the Indian media questioning his captaincy, but the tone changed after his match-winning performance in the first Test.

India won the Test series 3–0, keeping the same eleven throughout, and the One Day International series was drawn three games apiece.

Squads

Test series

1st Test

Speculation about the future of Azharuddin as captain was quelled as he guided India from a slightly wobbly 93/3 to a defendable 371.  His innings of 182 was supported by Sachin Tendulkar, Pravin Amre and Kapil Dev, with whom he added 123, 62, and 68 respectively.  None of the England bowlers looked threatening, and the decision to omit a second front-line spinner in order to play four seamers looked flawed, especially when Gooch finally turned to Graeme Hick and he ended up with three wickets, including Azharuddin's.

England's batting was insipid.  The top order failed miserably, slumping to 40/4 and 89/6, but the tail worked hard and Ian Salisbury came close to saving the follow-on after a three-hour stay at the crease for 28.  Second time around, they offered up more defiance, Alec Stewart and Mike Gatting showing some form, but insufficient to set India a challenging total.  Again, Salisbury (26) batted well, and was supported for more than an hour and a half by Paul Taylor, but ultimately to no avail.

India had a couple of scares on their way to the 79 that they needed to win, with Hick picking up two more wickets (Sidhu and Prabhakar), but never looked in any serious danger of collapsing.

Vinod Kambli and Rajesh Chauhan made their debuts for India in this match.  This was Graham Gooch's 100th Test match.

2nd Test

England's plans for the second Test were put awry by captain Gooch succumbing to a dodgy prawn curry the night before the match. Robin Smith was promoted to open the batting with Alec Stewart, who was relieved of wicketkeeping duties by Richard Blakey. Phil Tufnell came into the side, despite a lack of form.

India won the toss as proceeded to capitalise on the visitors' shortcomings, racking up 275/2 on the first day, including a century from Navjot Sidhu.  Sachin Tendulkar also went on to make a big century (165) on the second day and played some sublime strokes, including three boundaries in five balls from Malcolm to bring up his hundred, with further support from Amre (78) and Kapil Dev (66*), as India declared on 560/6, then their highest score against England.

Unfortunately for Mike Gatting, the innings was also notable for his dropping of what has been regarded as one of the easiest missed catches at all time. Fielding at silly point off Ian Salisbury, Gatting was left groping at thin air after batsman Kiran More popped up a simple chance to him.

In reply, England lost Smith early, but Stewart (74) and Hick (64) batted solidly, adding 113 for the second wicket.  Again though, England collapsed, from 157/2 to 220/7, and only Fairbrother's 83 made the total a respectable 286, but even that wasn't sufficient to avoid the follow-on.  The spinners starred for India, bowling all but 7 overs in the innings, and taking all 9 wickets that fell to bowlers, with Raju (4–103) the pick.  The story was similar in the second innings – Smith's 56 held together an otherwise flaky top order, which slumped to 99/6 before Chris Lewis took the attack back to the bowlers, finally delivering on the promise that many had seen for years. Lewis and Salisbury added 73, and Lewis and Tufnell another 56, but neither of these partnership were sufficient to prevent England losing by an innings.  Lewis's innings of 117, which included two sixes and 15 fours, was his maiden Test century.  Kumble picked up six wickets as he winkled most of the England batsmen out, while Kapil Dev set the tone by ripping out Stewart and Hick for ducks at the top of the order.

3rd Test

England's decision to go into the final Test of the series with just four specialist bowlers (Phillip DeFreitas, Lewis, Tufnell and John Emburey) looked justified when Gooch won the toss and elected to bat.  Jarvis, Malcolm and Salisbury were dropped, and Fairbrother was unwell and unable to play, so in came Atherton, Emburey, DeFreitas and the fit-again Gooch.  Blakey retained his place behind the stumps so that Stewart could once again open the batting.  India kept faith with the same team that had won the first two tests convincingly.

England were soon in trouble though, at 58/4, and then 118/6 as wickets once again fell in clusters.  Once Hick and Lewis (49) (demoted to number eight) were together though, batting looked an awful lot easier, as they put on 93 for the next wicket, and only started to get bogged down once the ball began turning more sharply.  Hick manipulated the tail masterfully though, and eked out a further 51 with Emburey and 68 with Tufnell (2*), before being the last man out, taken by a marvelous running catch by Kapil Dev for a Test career-best 178.

In reply, India made a positive start.  Prabhakar and Sidhu added 109 for the first wicket, and when that fell it only brought Vinod Kambli to the crease.  He and Tendulkar (78), two local boys, delighted the fans in adding 196 for the third wicket, batting together for almost the whole day on a slow wicket and seemingly carving boundaries from the bowling at will.  Kambli also received great support from another Bombay-based player, Amre (57), with whom he added 101, but eventually fell to Lewis for a magnificent 224, as India racked up a massive 591.

Set 244 to avoid an innings defeat, England started badly again. Prabhakar took the wickets of the top three batsmen, reducing the visitors to 34/3, and they never really recovered despite half-centuries from Smith and Gatting, and 47 from Hick.  The tail was unable to demonstrate the same resilience as in the first innings, only DeFreitas making double figures, and the Test series ended on a whimper for England when DeFreitas was stumped off Raju still sixteen runs short of making India bat a second time.

This marked just the second time that India had won three Tests in a series (the previous occasion being in New Zealand in 1967–68).

ODI series

1st ODI

2nd ODI

England needed 19 to win of the last two overs and got there off the final ball, two missed run-out attempts in the final over costing India dear. Kambli scored a hundred on his 21st birthday.

3rd ODI

4th ODI

5th ODI

6th ODI

7th ODI

References

External links
Cricket Archive

1993 in English cricket
1993 in Indian cricket
1992-93
Indian cricket seasons from 1970–71 to 1999–2000
International cricket competitions from 1991–92 to 1994